United States v. Sisson, 399 U.S. 267 (1970), was a legal case decided by the United States Supreme Court in 1970. The case is related to Selective Service law.

In this case, the jury recorded a verdict of guilt, but the judge then ordered an acquittal. The government appealed, but the Supreme Court held that the government had no power to appeal a verdict of acquittal, no matter how wrong the legal basis was for the acquittal.

Sisson was "the first important case won by a selective conscientious objector", a person who asserted that they were not opposed to serving in a war generally, but objected to serving in a specific war which they believed to be immoral.

References

External links
 

1970 in United States case law
United States Supreme Court cases
United States Supreme Court cases of the Burger Court